Gopal Raju (3 January 1928 – 10 April 2008) was an Indian-born American publisher, editor, journalist, businessman and philanthropist. He was considered to be a pioneer of Indian American ethnic media in the United States.

Career 
Raju launched the first successful Indian newspaper in the US, India Abroad, in 1970. The India Abroad newspaper refers to itself as the "oldest Indian newspaper published in North America." The newspaper quickly became an influential voice for the growing Indian American community in the United States. Raju's India Abroad was considered to be an important milestone for the growth of ethnic media in the U.S and one of the most credible Indian American publications. The Economist, a respected British weekly international affairs magazine, once referred to Raju's India Abroad as a daily publication of "unusually high quality".

In 1997, Raju held talks to merger India Abroad with India-West, an ethnic Indian American newspaper published in California. Raju and India-West publisher, Ramesh Murarka, went as far a jointly purchasing a building in San Leandro, California, to house the offices of the proposed, combined newspaper. Under the proposal, the existing India Abroad offices would have become the East Coast offices of the new newspaper, while the offices of India-West in California would have become the West Coast headquarters of the publication. However, in the end Raju and Murarka decided to abandon the proposed merger of the publications. Raju later sold India Abroad in April 2001 to Rediff.com, which currently owns and operates the newspaper.

Raju also founded the India Abroad News Service, which was later renamed the Indo-Asian News Service (IANS).
The IANS, which is headquartered in New Delhi, focuses its reporting on issues affecting India, South Asia and the Indian Diaspora around the world.

Raju remained involved with the Indian American media following his sale of India Abroad to Rediff.com in 2001. He began publishing several weekly newspapers in the United States, including the News India Times, the Gujarat Times and Desi Talk.

In 2006, Raju held discussions and agreed to a merger and alignment of News India Times, Desi Talk operations with South Asian Insider, a weekly newspaper run by Sharanjit Singh Thind. Thind is a self made media owner, who started his career in US with India Abroad as Marketing Manager and later formed NuWay Group, a media company. There was also an agreement between Mr. Raju and Thind to buy the whole News India Times Group later if Thind wishes. The agreement was short lived and never fully materialized because of overall declining Print market and respective papers. Raju remained the publisher of these three weekly publications until his death in 2008.

Philanthropy 
Additionally, Raju established and promoted several nonprofit, philanthropic organisations outside of the realm of publishing and media.

He founded the Indian American Foundation (IAF) during the 1970s. The IAF has raised millions of US dollars to fund medical, educational, development and disaster relief projects in India. Funds raised by the IAF have been used to rebuild homes and businesses following the Latur earthquake, which struck the Indian state of Maharashtra in 1993, as well as the 2001 Gujarat earthquake. Raju went on to later establish the Indian American Center for Political Action (IACPA) in 1993. The IACPA places Indian American students in internships within the offices of members of the United States House of Representatives and the United States Senate in Washington D.C. The IACPA, under Raju, has placed approximately 200 Indian American interns on Capitol Hill to date. Raju also ran the India Abroad Fellowship Program at Columbia University for several years.

Keeping in view the increasing population of North Indian and the need of Punjabi Newspaper, he started publishing Punjabi Newspaper Sher-e-Panjab. After successfully running 7–8 years he sold it to one of his employee with a commitment to continue this Punjabi Newspaper, which is still alive.

Honors 
Gopal Raju received several awards and recognitions during his career. In the US, Raju was honoured with the Leadership Award from the Asia Society in 2000. He was also given the Ellis Island Award in 2004. The Ellis Island Award recognises the contributions of immigrants to the United States. The Taraknath Das Foundation, which is headquartered in the United States, bestowed its annual award on Raju in 2006. He was inducted into the South Asian Journalists Association's Hall of Fame in 2008.

Former President of India, A.P.J. Abdul Kalam, conferred the Pravasi Bharatiya Samman on Raju in 2007 for his contributions in the media to India and the Indian diaspora.

Death 
Gopal Raju died at the age of 80 at a hospital in New York City on 10 April 2008. He had been hospitalised for about a week for the treatment of jaundice and is believed to have died from complications of the disease.

Tributes poured in from friends and colleagues. Former Prime Minister of India Inder Kumar Gujral stated, "He was a institution and also the most significant bridge between India and America." Sreenath Sreenivasan, the current dean of students at the Columbia University School of Journalism, also paid tribute to Raju saying, "Raju paved the way for every Indian journalist working in the US today. He was also tremendously supportive of SAJA (South Asian Journalists Association) and my own work."

Raju was once quoted as saying, "My job is to publish a quality newspaper and not to project myself."

References

External links 
 http://www.thesouthasian.info
 News India Times
 Gujarat Times
 Hindu Youth Network – Canada
 Desi Talk
 Indo-Asian News Service
 India Abroad
 Indian American Foundation
 Indiawest Online: Pioneer Publisher Gopal Raju Dies
 Thaindian News: Gopal Raju, pioneer of ethnic Indian media in US, is no more 
 Thaindian News: Gopal Raju’s legacy remembered in virtual memorial
 India Post: Ethnic Indian media pioneer Gopal Raju dead
 Gopal Raju's Passing: dozens of tributes and comments SAJAforum.org collection.

2008 deaths
1928 births
American people of Indian descent
Indian publishers (people)
Businesspeople from Bangalore
Indian emigrants to the United States
Indian mass media owners
American newspaper publishers (people)
Journalists from Karnataka
Philanthropists from New York (state)
Indian philanthropists
American print editors
American male journalists
American writers of Indian descent
Journalists from New York City
20th-century Indian businesspeople
20th-century American philanthropists
20th-century Indian journalists
Recipients of Pravasi Bharatiya Samman